Racing Athletic Club is an Argentine sports club located in Olavarría, Buenos Aires Province. The club is mostly known for its football team, which currently plays in Torneo Argentino A, the regionalised third division of Argentine football league system.

Apart from football, other sports practised at the institution are tennis, basketball, softball, bicycle racing, racquetball and bowls.

External links

Official website
El Chaira
Chaira a Muerte
Racing results at Mundo Ascenso website

Association football clubs established in 1916
Football clubs in Buenos Aires Province
1916 establishments in Argentina